D-glycero-α-D-manno-heptose 1,7-bisphosphate 7-phosphatase (EC 3.1.3.83) is an enzyme with systematic name D-glycero-α-D-manno-heptose 1,7-bisphosphate 7-phosphohydrolase. This enzyme catalyses the following chemical reaction

 D-glycero-α-D-manno-heptose 1,7-bisphosphate + H2O   D-glycero-α-D-manno-heptose 1-phosphate + phosphate

The enzyme is involved in biosynthesis of GDP-D-glycero-α-D-manno-heptose.

References

External links 
 

EC 3.1.3